Chrysoesthia atriplicella is a moth of the family Gelechiidae. It is found in southern France and on Sardinia.

The larvae feed on Atriplex halimus. They mine the leaves of their host plant. The mine has the form of a full-depth corridor, continued into a transparent blotch. In the corridor, the frass is deposited in an interrupted line. In the blotch it is deposited in a broad strip. Pupation takes place outside of the mine. Larvae can be found from April to May.

References

Moths described in 1939
Chrysoesthia
Moths of Europe